The British Boot Company (formerly known as Holts) is a shoe shop in Camden Town in London notable for being a leading UK stockist of English brands such as Dr Martens, Grinders, Solovair, Gladiator, George Cox, Tredair and NPS.

The shop was founded as "Holts" in 1851, selling hobnail boots. In the 1980s, the shop changed its name to British Boot Company, but the business was still run by the same family.

In the 1970s and early 1980s the shop was popular with skinheads and punks from all over the world, who came to buy bovver boots or brothel creepers. Customers could borrow a marker pen to write messages on the walls that would then be read by other skinhead crews or punk bands on tour.

In the late 1970s, the shop's owner, Alan Roumana, formed a close association with the local band North London Invaders, who would later become Madness. The band used to buy loafers from the shop, and they featured the store in their music videos "The Prince" and "The Sun and The Rain". Members of The Clash, Sex Pistols and UK Subs also became regular customers.

External links
Official website

Shops in London